Great Truckin' Songs of the Renaissance is the debut album by the Australian band TISM. The album peaked at No. 48 on the ARIA Charts in October 1988.

The vinyl version has a different vocal mix on the track, "Saturday Night Palsy", including an alternate line of lyrics, with the line "I want to shoot heroin through the eye" replaced by "I want to shove a red-hot poker through the eye" on the CD.

The title is derived from the band's first album-length recording, which was recorded in December 1982, shortly after the group's formation.

In March 2022, LP and CD reissues were announced, with the CD containing a bonus album with 40 minutes of unreleased content. A cassette reissue, featuring the bonus content and the LP version of the cover art on cassette for the first time, had been released that February. The CD was released that May, with the LP following in August due to delays involving the cover art.

Singles
 "40 Years – Then Death" was released in September 1987 as the album's lead single. The song details an early-twenties male's despondent view of his remaining sex life: 40 more years of "living" then "death".
 "The Ballad of John Bonham's Coke Roadie" was released in May 1988. The song deals with the assistant to Led Zeppelin drummer, John Bonham, whose job was to procure cocaine for the musician. Throughout the song the musician compares his life to that of an ordinary person whose life is racked with misery and spousal unfaithfulness, contrasted with that of the roadie, whose only concern is the acquisition of cocaine.
 "I'm Interested in Apathy" was released in September 1988 as the album's third single. At the ARIA Music Awards of 1989, the song won ARIA Award for Best Independent Release.
"Saturday Night Palsy" was released in January 1989 as the fourth single. The song focuses on a man who has the inability to decide on matters, particularly, in which manner to harm himself. The song continues through with various opposing scenarios offered by the man, but at the end nothing has been resolved. A music video was directed by Peter Bain-Hog and featured a handsome man spending his day getting ready to go out dancing. Eventually he finds himself outside of a TISM concert and denied entry, at the end of the video, he is so dejected by the experience that he commits suicide by hanging himself in a nearby alley. TISM performed the song Australian variety TV show, Hey Hey It's Saturday.
"Martin Scorsese Is Really Quite a Jovial Fellow" was released in June 1989 as the album's fifth and final single. The song deals with the dark and often depressing nature of Scorsese's subjects and the way that a normally happy or perky person would also be quite depressed after watching one of his films.

Reception 

The Ages Shaun Carney, in September 1988, described Great Truckin' Songs of the Renaissance as "a fine piece of work. Clever clever they might be on occasions, but if a few more bands applied even half the humor, social observation and melodic intervention that TISM seems to simply toss off, the world would be a, um, groovier place."

Jonathan Lewis of AllMusic rated the album as four-and-a-half stars out of five, he explained "Completely tasteless and musically mediocre, the album was nonetheless fresh, witty, and extremely funny. The album is more or less standard guitar rock, but it is the song lyrics that make this album great."

In December 2004 FasterLouders Kathryn Kernohan felt the group had "always written simple, direct pop songs... [their] basic structure has remained the same – danceable guitar and keyboard lines coupled with catchy choruses. The band’s ability to write a ridiculously good pop song is second-to-none and this is no better exemplified than in Great Truckin’ Songs opening tracks." She noticed that "The second record of the double-vinyl set (it's not as much fun on CD, is it?) contains various odds and ends, including snippets of a Triple R interview in which the band rode into the studio on lawnmowers."

Track listing

The bonus tracks on the 2022 release are broken up with documentary-style narration and radio advertisements for concerts.

Personnel 
 Ron Hitler-Barassi (Peter Minack) - lead vocals
 Leek Van Vlalen (Sean Kelly) - guitar, backing vocals
 Eugene de la Hot Croix Bun (Eugene Cester) - keyboards, lead vocals, backing vocals
 John St. Peenis (Mark Fessey) - saxophone, lead vocals, backing vocals
 Jock Cheese (John Holt) - bass, backing vocals
 Humphrey B. Flaubert (Damian Cowell) - lead vocals, drum programming, drums, backing vocals

Charts

Release history

References

1988 debut albums
TISM albums